Fausto Papetti (Viggiù, 28 January 1923 – San Remo, 15 June 1999) was an Italian alto saxophone player. A jazz musician by formation, Papetti became widely known for producing instrumental covers of some of the most famous pop and jazz songs.

Papetti reached the height of his popularity in the 1960s and 1970s. His albums were particularly successful in the European and Latin American markets. During the 1970s, Papetti's first greatest hits album, published in 1975, is to these days his best-selling album. His performance of the song "Love's Theme" (originally by Barry White's Love Unlimited Orchestra) was featured on the breakbeat compilation "Ultimate Breaks and Beats". His influence on saxophone music was substantial and in the 1970s many imitators appeared, like Johnny Sax and Piergiorgio Farina.

Papetti's records are also characterized for their sexy covers, often featuring scantily clad women. He occasionally recorded under the pseudonym Fausto Danieli.

Discography

Albums
Musica Nel Mondo, Vol. 2 (2004)
Musica Nel Mondo (2004)
E Se Domani (2003)
Ritmi Dell'America Latina (2003)
Moon River (2003)
Chloe (2003)
Evergreens No. 3 (2003)
Scandalo Al Sole [D.V. More] (2003)
If You Leave Me Now (2003)
Accarezzami (2003)
Cinema: Anni 70 (2003)
Cinema: Anni 60 (2003)
Made in Italy [BMG] (2003)
Bonjour France (2003)
Evergreens (2003)
Memory (2003)
Evergreens, Vol. 2 (2001)
The Look of Love (2000)
Calda Estate (1999)
What A Wonderful World [Expanded] (1998)
Sax Latino (1997)
Made in Italy [Ricordi] (1997)
More Feelings (1996)
More Feelings Again (1996)
Fausto Papetti (1995)
The Magic Sax of Fausto Papetti (1995)
Sax in Gold (1994)
El Cine (1994)
El Mundo de Fausto Papetti (1994)
Ecos de New York, Vol. 2 (1991)
Ecos de Hollywood (1991)
Ecos de Brasil, Vol. 2 (1991)
Ecos de Italia, Vol. 2 (1991)
Maria Elena (1991)
Feelings (1991)
Magic Sax (1990)
Us and Them (Fausto Papetti album)|Us and Them (1988)
Midnight Melodies (Fausto Papetti album)|Midnight Melodies (1988)
Baby Blue Music, Vol. 1 (1987)
Il Mondo Di Papetti, Vol. 3 (1987)
Baby Blue Music, Vol. 2 (1987)
Il Mondo Di Papetti, Vol. 2 (1986)
Sax Idea (1984)
My One and Only Love (1982)
Old America (1981)
The Sexy Sax (1979)

Box sets and compilations
Fausto Papetti Collection (2006)
Le Piu Belle Melodie di Fausto Papetti (2006)
Fausto Papetti Collection, Vol. 2 (2006)
I Grandi Successi Originali (2000)
Oggi, Vol. 4 (1999)
Oggi, Vol. 3 (1999)
Oggi, Vol. 2 (1999)
Oggi, Vol. 1 (1999)	
What a Wonderful World (1998)
Gli Anni D'Oro (1997)
Econo Series (1997)
Scandalo Al Sole [Replay] (1995)
20 Exitos, Vol. 2 (1994)
20 Exitos (1994)
All Time Favorites (Fausto Papetti album)|All Time Favorites (1991)
Il Mondo Di Papetti (1988)

1923 births
1999 deaths
People from Viggiù
Italian jazz saxophonists
Male saxophonists
Italian pop musicians
20th-century Italian musicians
Italian bandleaders
20th-century saxophonists
20th-century Italian male musicians
Male jazz musicians
Italian saxophonists